The Portsea Hole is a depression in the seafloor of Port Phillip near Portsea in Victoria, Australia.

Features
It is characterized by diverse and abundant fish assemblages as well as a rich benthic community of marine invertebrates, encrusting algae, sponges and soft corals.

The wall has small overhangs which are home to plenty of marine life, including the beautiful Blue Devil fish. The Portsea Hole is a very popular boat dive site for recreational scuba diving activities.

See also

 Protected areas of Victoria

References

External links
 
 

Underwater diving sites in Australia
Port Phillip